Clayton Adams (born January 15, 1995) is an American soccer player who currently plays as a midfielder for the Columbus Rapids in the National Indoor Soccer League.

Following an open tryout in Bettendorf, Iowa, Adams signed his first professional contract in January 2019, joining Austin Bold FC of the USL Championship.

On February 10, 2020 it was announced that Adams had signed with Chattanooga FC of the National Independent Soccer Association.

Adams signed with Tormenta FC on February 18, 2021.

References

External links
Austin Bold profile

NISL profile

1995 births
Living people
Georgia Revolution FC players
Austin Bold FC players
National Premier Soccer League players
People from Warner Robins, Georgia
USL Championship players
American soccer players
Association football forwards
Soccer players from Georgia (U.S. state)
Soccer players from Louisiana
Chattanooga FC players
Tormenta FC players
People from Slidell, Louisiana